Pakenham East is a suburb of the Greater Melbourne metropolitan area situated south-east of Melbourne City. Pakenham East is located in the Shire of Cardinia local government area.

History 
Pakenham East is situated in the Kulin nation traditional Aboriginal country. The Boon Wurrung people are local custodians within the Kulin nation. The origin of the suburb name is from Sir Edward Pakenham and the geographic position east of the Pakenham main settlement.

The Pakenham East development plan was submitted by the Victorian Planning Authority (VPA) in October 2018. Pakenham East was approved as a suburb on the 2 January 2021. Prior to the suburb's creation, the area was part of Pakenham and Nar Nar Goon.

Geography 
The Pakenham East precinct would consist of an area of 6.3 km2 of land generally bounded by Deep Creek and Ryan Road to the west, Mount Ararat North Road and Mount Ararat South Road to the east, and the Princes Freeway to the south. Properties south of Seymour Road form the northern boundary.

Development 
Development in Pakenham East would include a town centre, residential, educational facilities, parks and recreation, sporting facilities, as well as cycling paths and pedestrian infrastructure.

Transport 
Pakenham East is situated along the Princes Highway east of the Pakenham main settlement. The proposed Pakenham East railway station that is part of a congestion reduction and safety upgrade of the Pakenham railway line, with an expected completion date of 2024, would service Pakenham East.

References 

Suburbs of the Shire of Cardinia